Filomicrobium insigne is a Gram-negative, aerobic, motile bacteria from the genus of Filomicrobium which was isolated from soil in the coastal Shengli Oilfield in Shandong Province in eastern China.

References

External links
Type strain of Filomicrobium insigne at BacDive -  the Bacterial Diversity Metadatabase

 

Hyphomicrobiales
Bacteria described in 2009